I'm in Charge (simplified Chinese: 小子当家) is a Singaporean television drama series. It stars Elvin Ng, Sheila Sim and Aloysius Pang as the main characters in the story. The story revolves around a rebellious teenager who shoulders the responsibility of being the man of the house, and through the process familiar themes of family love and adolescence.

It was broadcast on MediaCorp Channel 8 from 27 May 2013 to 21 June 2013. A total of 20 episodes were aired during this period. It will subsequently be aired by Malaysian television channel Astro Shuang Xing from 13 June 2013 to 10 July 2013.

Episodes

See also
List of MediaCorp Channel 8 Chinese Drama Series (2010s)

References

Lists of Singaporean television series episodes
2013 Singaporean television series debuts
2013 Singaporean television series endings
Mediacorp